Mark L. Smith is an American physician and plastic surgeon based in New York City. He is Chief of Plastic Surgery at Mount Sinai Beth Israel Beth Israel Medical Center, Director of Plastic Surgery for Continuum Cancer Centers of New York, Director, The Friedman Center for Lymphedema Research and Treatment, CoDirector of The Lipedema Project, and Professor of Surgery at Icahn School of Medicine at Mount Sinai. His areas of focus include microsurgical breast reconstruction, head and neck reconstruction, facial paralysis, reconstruction of congenital defects and the surgical treatment of lymphedema and lipedema.

Early life, education
Smith was born in Huntington, NY and raised in the United States. He attended college at Cornell University in Ithaca, New York and graduated with a BA in biology in 1987. In 1991 Smith earned his medical degree from the Albert Einstein College of Medicine in the Bronx, New York.

His post-doctoral training included:
1991–1994: General Surgery Residency – Columbia-Presbyterian Medical Center, New York, NY
1994–1996: Plastic Surgery Residency – Columbia-Presbyterian Medical Center, New York, NY
1996–1997: Fellowship in Microsurgery and Oncologic Reconstruction – MD Anderson Cancer Center in Houston, Texas
1997–1998: Fellowship in Craniofacial and Pediatric Plastic Surgery – University of Washington, Seattle, WA

Smith was certified by the American Board of Plastic Surgery in 2000, and recertified in 2008. Smith began doing volunteer medical work in 1993, traveling to Guatemala with Healing the Children to perform cleft lip and cleft palate surgeries. Since then he has worked and volunteered at clinics and hospitals in countries as diverse as Peru, Egypt, Ghana, Israel and Vietnam.

Career
Smith is Chief of Plastic Surgery at Mount Sinai Beth Israel Medical Center. He has been an attending physician at Mount Sinai Morningside and Mount Sinai West since 1999, at the New York Eye and Ear Infirmary since 2001, and at St. Vincent's Medical Center from 2002 to 2010. Smith serves as Director of Plastic Surgery for Continuum Cancer Centers of New York, a multi-hospital cancer program including Beth Israel, Mount Sinai Morningside, Mount Sinai West, and New York Eye and Ear Infirmary. He has developed numerous programs at Continuum including the Oncoplastic Breast Reconstruction Program, the Facial Nerve Program, the Lymphedema program and the Continuum Cleft Palate and Craniofacial Center. He is a Professor of Surgery at Icahn School of Medicine at Mount Sinai.

Smith is a diplomate of the American Board of Plastic Surgery and a Fellow of the American College of Surgeons. He is also a member of professional societies such as the American Society of Plastic Surgeons. From 2001 to 2013, he has been recognized by Best Doctors as one of the "Best Doctors in America."

Publishing and Media
Smith has published chapters and articles in numerous textbooks and medical journals including Head and Neck, Plastic and Reconstructive Surgery, Laryngoscope, Operative Plastic Surgery, Pediatric Annals, Annals of Plastic Surgery, The Breast Journal, The Journal of Reconstructive Miscrosurgery and Microsurgery.  In January 2008, he performed a live webcast for OR Live demonstrating breast reconstruction using the DIEP flasp for a patient undergoing bilateral nipple-sparing mastectomies.

In May 2009, he was profiled in a three-part documentary entitled A Change of Face, which aired on MSNBC-TV (episode 0427). The mini−series followed patients through the surgical treatment of facial disfigurements. Smith has also been an invited medical expert on the CBS Early Show and CNN.

Clinical focus
Smith is an expert in microsurgery and craniofacial surgery with experience in reconstruction for cancer, congenital defects, and trauma. His cancer practice includes patients with breast, head and neck, cutaneous, and colorectal malignancies. He also treats patients with complex birth defects such as cleft lip and palate, craniosynostosis, congenital facial paralysis and vascular malformations including: hemangiomas, arteriovenous malformations (AVMs) and lymphatic malformations. His current practice is focused on surgical innovations in breast reconstruction, facial paralysis and lymphedema treatment.

Smith specializes in microsurgical breast reconstruction, including the DIEP flap, TUG flap, SIEA flap, and GAP flap. He was the first surgeon to perform DIEP flap breast reconstructions in New York City. He was also an early advocate for Oncoplastic breast surgery and published one of the first case studies in the U.S. using oncoplastic techniques for breast conservation in patients with breast cancer. He has spoken nationally and internationally on breast conservation techniques using perforator flaps and microsurgery for partial breast reconstruction.

Smith has also been involved in advancing lymphatic surgery for lymphedema. He and his colleague Dr. Joseph Dayan were the first surgeons in North America to perform successful vascularized lymph node transfer to the wrist to treat lymphedema.  They have since developed a technique known as "Reverse Lymphatic Mapping," a modification of Dr. Suzanne Klimberg's technique of "Axillary Reverse Mapping." Smith is one of seven surgeons who founded the American Society for Lymphatic Surgery.

References

External links
MarkSmithMD.com
Mark L. Smith CV

Living people
Cornell University alumni
Albert Einstein College of Medicine alumni
American plastic surgeons
People from Huntington, New York
Year of birth missing (living people)